Víctor Gabriel Varela López (born 20 April 1973) is a Mexican politician affiliated with Morena, who has served as a federal deputy in the LXIV and LXV Legislatures of the Mexican Congress, representing a district in Mexico City. Between 2006 and 2009 he was a deputy of the LX Legislature from the Party of the Democratic Revolution, representing a district in the then-Federal District.

References

1973 births
Living people
Politicians from Mexico City
Deputies of the LX Legislature of Mexico
Deputies of the LXIV Legislature of Mexico
Deputies of the LXV Legislature of Mexico
Members of the Chamber of Deputies (Mexico) for Mexico City
Party of the Democratic Revolution politicians
Morena (political party) politicians
21st-century Mexican politicians
Members of the Congress of Mexico City